Madame Sherry is a 1917 American silent comedy film directed by Ralph Dean and starring Gertrude McCoy, Frank O'Connor and Jean Stuart. It is based on the 1910 musical play of the same title.

Cast
 Gertrude McCoy as Yvonne Sherry
 Frank O'Connor as Edward Sherry
 H.J. Quealy as Theophilus Sherry
 Jean Stuart as Pepita
 Alphie James as Catherine Al
 Lucy Carter as Lulu
 Jack Mundy as Phillippe

References

Bibliography
 Goble, Alan. The Complete Index to Literary Sources in Film. Walter de Gruyter, 1999.

External links
 

1917 films
1917 comedy films
1910s English-language films
American silent feature films
Silent American comedy films
American black-and-white films
1910s American films